The  is a river in Japan which flows through Gifu Prefecture. It is part of the Kiso River system.

History
Taguchi Castle (田口城 Taguchi Shiro) was built in 1540 by the Nagaya clan. However, it was destroyed in 1594, when they were beaten by Satō Katamasa in battle.

River communities
The Itadori river flows through Seki and Mino in Gifu Prefecture.

References

Rivers of Gifu Prefecture
Rivers of Japan